Uelzen, officially the Hanseatic Town of Uelzen, is a town in northeast Lower Saxony, Germany, and capital of the district of Uelzen. It is part of the Hamburg Metropolitan Region, a Hanseatic town and an independent municipality.

Uelzen is characterised by timber-framed architecture and also has some striking examples of North German brick Gothic. The town earned pan-regional fame when Friedensreich Hundertwasser was selected to redesign the station: the final work of the celebrated Viennese artist and architect was ceremonially opened in 2000 as the Hundertwasser Station, Uelzen, and has since been a popular tourist magnet.

Geography

Location 
Uelzen lies on the eastern edge of the Lüneburg Heath. The town is a transport hub on the north–south axis from Hamburg to Hanover as well as the east–west axis from Bremen to Berlin. Also of economic importance is its location on the  Elbe Lateral Canal. The town has a charming setting, situated as it is on the heath river, the Ilmenau, with its grassy river banks, small parks, and water meadows. Large areas in the vicinity of Uelzen have been set aside as nature parks with moors, woods, lakes, and heathland: the Elbhöhen-Wendland Nature Park, Lüneburg Heath Nature Park and Lower Saxon Elbe Valley Water Meadows Biosphere Reserve.

Divisions 
The following parishes belong to the borough of Uelzen: Groß Liedern, Halligdorf, Hambrock, Hansen, Hanstedt II, Holdenstedt, Kirchweyhe, Klein Süstedt, Masendorf, Mehre, Molzen, Oldenstadt, Riestedt, Ripdorf, Tatern, Veerßen, Westerweyhe, and Woltersburg.

Furthermore, there are four other places that have the status of "special parishes" (Sonstige Ortsteile): Borne, Kl. Liedern, Pieperhöfen, and Oldenstadt-West.

History

The town was founded in 1250. In 1270 Duke John of Brunswick-Lüneburg, a Welf who ruled the Principality of Lüneburg from 1252 to 1277, granted Uelzen its town privileges (Stadtrechte). In the Middle Ages it became an active member of the Hanseatic League. The town fortification, built in the 14th century, originally had 3 gates, a wall, and a moat. Parts of the wall are still standing.

While Uelzen only played a small role in the Hanseatic League, there is evidence that it traded with Livonia and Spain. "At the Schnellenmarket, a London trading office purchased Uelzener linen, earthenware pitchers were offered for sale and brewery business flourished. On 21 October 1470, Uelzen was the venue for a Hanseatic League Convention. A special honour as these resolutions of the association of cities only took place annually - primarily in Lübeck."

The town became part of the Electorate of Hanover in 1708, the Kingdom of Westphalia in 1807, the Kingdom of Hanover in 1814, and the Prussian Province of Hanover in 1866.

Uelzen was the site of a Nazi concentration camp that was established in Uelzen until 17 April 1945. The camp was a subcamp of the Neuengamme concentration camp.

Uelzen was hit by five air raids on 18 April 1944, 10 November 1944, 27 November 1944, 22 February 1945 and 7 April 1945 and 1362 buildings were destroyed or damaged. The heaviest raid was on 22 February 1945 when 149 people lost their lives and 95 houses were completely destroyed. On 7 April 1944, three civilians were killed and 153 houses were destroyed or damaged  The town as a whole was destroyed by 27 per cent.

Governance

Uelzen belongs to the Bundestag constituency of Celle-Uelzen. In 2009 Henning Otte (CDU) was directly elected, having been on the state list (place 19) since 2005. Kirsten Lühmann (SPD) was elected in 2009 via the state list. In the years 1998, 2002 and 2005 Peter Struck (SPD), former defence minister and chairman of the SPD party in the German Bundestag, was directly elected.

Mayor
The mayor of Uelzen since 2014 has been Jens Markwardt (independent). In the 2014 election he was confirmed in office with 64.4% of the vote. The deputy mayors are Karsten Jäkel (CDU) und Ariane Schmäschke (The Greens).

 1913–1946: Johann Maria Farina.
 1946: Dr. Heinz Lücke (CDU).
 1946–1948: Adolf Hochgraefe (SPD).
 1948–1950: Dr. Heinz Lücke.
 1950–1952: Adolf Hochgraefe.
 1952–1961: Dr. Heinz Lücke.
 1961–1963: Adolf Hochgraefe.
 1963–1964: Dr. Heinz Lücke.
 1964–1972: Alfred Krüger (CDU).
 1972–1979: Rudi Schrödter (SPD).
 1979–1981: Hans-Alexander Drechsler (SPD).
 1981–1991: Rudolf Froin (CDU).
 1991–1997: Günter Leifert (SPD).
 1997–2001: Günter Leifert (hauptamtlich).
 2001–2014: Otto Lukat (SPD).
 2014: Jürgen Markwardt (independent).

Twin towns – sister cities

Uelzen is twinned with:
 Barnstaple, England, United Kingdom
 Bois-Guillaume, France
 Kobryn, Belarus
 Tikaré, Burkina Faso

Arts and culture

Theatre
The number of cultural offerings is large and varied given the size of the city. The multitude of cinemas, the theatre on the Ilmenau (Theater an der Ilmenau), the Jabelmann Events Hall and the fringe theatre on the Rosenmauer are some of Uelzens attractions.

Museums
Worthy of mention is the Holdenstedt Castle Museum (Museum Schloss Holdenstedt) which is the town's local history museum. Permanent exhibitions include furniture from the Middle Ages to art nouveau, a glass collection, works by the animal painter, Georg Wolf, and archaeological finds from the local area.

Economy

The largest sugarbeet refinery in the Nordzucker group is in Uelzen. It processes approximately 20,000 tons of sugarbeet per day. Further big employers in the town are Nestlé Schöller or the dairy Uelzena. Bituminous roofing felts and insulation material is being manufactured by C. Hasse & Sohn, a leading producer with experience since 1872.

Infrastructure

Railway station
The Hundertwasserbahnhof is a railway station in Uelzen at the eastern edge of the Lüneburg Heath Nature Park in northeastern Lower Saxony. The cities within easy reach by rail are Hamburg, Hannover, Lüneburg, Celle, Braunschweig, Bremen and Berlin.

The original station was renovated for Expo 2000 following plans by the Austrian artist and architect Friedensreich Hundertwasser.  An "environmentally, culturally oriented" station, Uelzen station was renamed as 'Hundertwasser Station, Uelzen' (Hundertwasser-Bahnhof Uelzen).  Today it is one of the town's popular tourist attractions.

Courts
Uelzen has at its disposal an Amtsgericht (roughly, a district court), which belongs to the state court region of Lüneburg and the Oberlandesgericht (High State Court) region of Celle.

Education
Schools in Uelzen include the Herzog-Ernst-Gymnasium, Lessing-Gymnasium, Oberschule-Uelzen, Lucas-Backmeister-Schule, Sternschule, Berufsbildene Schulen I and II and 6 elementary schools.

Health and medicine

Uelzen has one hospital (HELIOS Klinikum), two clinics that specialises in different areas (Klinik Veerßen and Psychiatrische Klinik Uelzen) and some pharmacies and dentists.

Notable people

Ernest I, Duke of Brunswick-Lüneburg (1497–1546), Prince of Lüneburg, ruled the Lüneburg-Celle subdivision of the Welf family's Brunswick-Lüneburg duchy from 1520 until his death
Francis, Duke of Brunswick-Lüneburg (1508–1549), ruled the newly founded Duchy of Gifhorn from Gifhorn Castle 
Eberhard August Wilhelm von Zimmermann (1743–1815), geographer and biologist
Friedrich Kuhlau (1786–1832), court composer to the Danish royal court
Georg Wilding (1790–1841), royal-Neapolitan envoy in St. Petersburg
Theodore Kaufmann (1814–1896), American painter
Walter Wallmann (1932–2013), politician (CDU)
Angelika Volquartz (born 1946), politician (CDU), 2003–2009 Mayor of Kiel
Rebecca Harms (born 1956), politician (The Greens)
Mola Adebisi (born 1973), TV presenter (VIVA)
André Doehring (born 1973), musicologist

See also
List of subcamps of Neuengamme.

Notes

References
Official German list of concentration camps Verzeichnis der Konzentrationslager und ihrer Außenkommandos 
Johann Parum Schultze; Reinhold Olesch (Hrsg.): Fontes linguae Dravaenopolabicae minores et Chronica Venedica J. P. Schultzii. (= Slavistische Forschungen; Band 7). Böhlau, Köln und Graz 1967
Christian Hennig von Jessen: Vocabularium Venedicum (oder Wendisches Wörter-Buch) (1705). Nachdruck besorgt von Reinhold Olesch. - Köln [u.a.]: Böhlau 1959 (Gewährsmann des Pastors C. Hennig von Jessen war der polabisch sprechende Bauer Johann Janieschge aus Klennow)

External links 

 Official site 
 Uelzen website translated to English with google translation
 

Towns in Lower Saxony
Neuengamme concentration camp
Uelzen (district)